Świętopełk Mieszkowic (b. ca. 980 – d. bef. 991?), was a Polish prince member of the House of Piast.

He was the third son of Mieszko I of Poland but the second born from his second marriage with Oda, daughter of Dietrich of Haldensleben, Margrave of the North March.

Life
Nothing is known about his first years of life. Świętopełk is only named in the chronicles of Thietmar of Merseburg; he was omitted in the document "Dagome iudex" (ca. 991/92), which names his parents and full-brothers Mieszko and Lambert, a fact which indicates that he may have been dead by that time, in or before 991.

Another hypothesis stated that the absence of Świętopełk from the "Dagome iudex" was because he was already in Western Pomerania, which was granted to him as a fief and in consequence he was the ancestor of the earlier Dukes of Pomerania; however, this theory is now discarded by the majority of modern historians, who linked the first Pomeranian Dukes with the Piast Dynasty through a daughter of either Mieszko I or Baltic Žemužil  .

References
 Thietmari chronicon (edited by Marian Zygmunt Jedlicki), Poznań 1953, p. 224.
 Balzer O., Genealogia Piastów, Kraków 1895.
 Gieysztor A., Świętopełk, [in:] Słownik starożytności słowiańskich, 1975, vol. V, p. 585.
 Jasiński K., Rodowód pierwszych Piastów, Wrocław-Warsaw 1992.
 Labuda G., Czy książęta zachodniopomorscy wywodzili się z Piastów?, (in:) Studia i materiały do Dziejów Wielkopolski i Pomorza, 1958, vol. IV, No 1, pp. 33–47.
 G. Labuda, Mieszko I, Wrocław 2002, p. 154, 199.
 Rymar E., Dagome iudex jako organiczna część decyzji Mieszka I w sprawie podziału Polski na dzielnice. Reanimacja hipotezy o piastowskim rodowodzie dynastii pomorskiej, 1986, pp. 293–348.
 J. Widajewicz, Początki Polski, Wrocław 1948.
 Z. Wojciechowski, Polska nad Wisłą i Odrą w X wieku, Katowice 1939, p. 111.

980s births
Piast dynasty
10th-century deaths